Ehrler is a German surname. Notable people with the surname include:

Bremer Ehrler (1914–2013), American politician
Désirée Ehrler (born 1991), Swiss racing cyclist
Heinrich Ehrler (1917–1945), German World War II flying ace

See also
Erler

German-language surnames